Nucleolar transcription factor 1 is a protein that in humans is encoded by the UBTF gene.

Function 

Upstream binding factor (UBF) is a transcription factor required for expression of the 18S, 5.8S, and 28S ribosomal RNAs, along with SL1 (a complex of TBP (MIM 600075) and three TBP-associated factors or 'TAFs'). Two UBF polypeptides, of 94 and 97 kD, exist in the human (Bell et al., 1988). UBF is a nucleolar phosphoprotein with both DNA binding and transactivation domains. Sequence-specific DNA binding to the core and upstream control elements of the human rRNA promoter is mediated through several HMG boxes (Jantzen et al., 1990).[supplied by OMIM]

Interactions 

UBTF has been shown to interact with:
 CSNK2A1, 
 RB1, 
 TAF1C,  and
 TAF1.

References

Further reading